Paroy-sur-Saulx (literally Paroy on Saulx) is a commune in the Haute-Marne department in north-eastern France. It is located about 35 km south east of Saint-Dizier.

See also
Communes of the Haute-Marne department

References

Paroysursaulx